General elections were held in Sweden on 20 September 1998. The Swedish Social Democratic Party remained the largest party in the Riksdag, winning 131 of the 349 seats.

The incumbent Social Democratic minority government, led by Göran Persson, was returned to power despite losing seats and receiving fewer votes than in their 1991 defeat. They remained in power with support from the Left Party and the Green Party. While the three left-wing parties saw a net loss of 11 seats, the Left Party nearly doubled its representation in the Riksdag. This reflected how many Social Democratic voters were dissatisfied with the policies of the government, which had implemented austerity measures to reduce the budget deficit.

The Social Democrats were able to form a government in spite of the sizeable decline of the vote, since the centre-right parties failed to recover more than a net share of 11 seats out of the required 27. The most notable gain was that the capital Stockholm going blue in spite of a stable nationwide left-leaning majority, something that previously had been unlikely. In suburban areas around Stockholm and Gothenburg several municipalities also flipped blue. Other gains were in the blue heartlands of Southern Sweden, with Jönköping and Linköping being major pickups.

Even so, smaller municipalities away from the bigger cities gave the red-green bloc a sizeable edge, with the Left Party getting into double-digits nationwide. Even though there was a drop of support in major cities, many areas that had previously voted blue remained with the red-green bloc. For the Social Democrats, the steep drop of the party's nationwide vote share was still felt in many of its historically strong industrial areas. The party's vote share had dropped to a 70-year low and many absolute majorities from 1994 election were lost.

Besides from the Left Party, the other party that made major gains were the Christian Democrats. The party had been on the verge of falling out of the Riksdag in 1994, yet almost tripled its vote share to end up at 11.8%, even being the largest centre-right party in its stronghold of Jönköping County. The former heads of government, the Centre Party, continued its decline and recorded 5.1% of the vote, more than a million fewer overall votes than in the 1970s elections. The People's Party fared even worse at 4.7%.

Results

There were 5,261,109 valid ballots cast, a sizeable decrease in turnout from the 1994 election, with turnout dropping from 86.8% to 81.4%.

Seat distribution

By municipality

References

General elections in Sweden
Sweden
General
Sweden